Nanisivik is a now-abandoned company town which was built in 1975 to support the lead-zinc mining and mineral processing operations for the Nanisivik Mine, in production between 1976 and 2002.

It is used by the Canadian Coast Guard for training.

Demographics 

In the 2021 Canadian census conducted by Statistics Canada, Nanisivik had a population of 0, no change from its 2016 population of 0.

Geology
The ore deposit resides within dolomite from the Society Cliffs Formation covered with dolomitic shale from the Victor Bay Formation, which together form the Uluksan Group and reside on top of silty shale. The ore is believed to have formed when hot saline water bearing the metal ions of sodium, calcium, chlorine, and sulfate mixed with cooler carbonate-rich brine in the presence of natural gas or methane, which produced hydrogen sulfide through reducing the sulfate. The hydrogen sulfide then reacted with the metals to form the sulfides of marcasite (FeS2), pyrite, sphalerite, and galena (PbS). The Nanisivik deposit once contained 60 million metric tons of pyrite and 12 million tons of lead-zinc ore.

Mineralogy
The Nanisivik mine is known for its diversity of unusual pyrite pseudomorphs after marcasite and pyrrhotite.

History

Ore discovery
Arthur English was a prospector on CGS Arctic, the steamship of Captain Joseph-Elzéar Bernier, as part of the Geological Survey of Canada in 1910. They wintered the 1910-11 winter in Arctic Bay ( south-east of Nanisivik). In 1911 Arthur English published his discovery of a "very large body of ore" at Nanisivik.

Development
J.F. Tibbitt and F. McInnes travelled from Churchill, Manitoba to Nanisivik by dog sled and staked their claims in 1937, but were unable to develop them. In 1956 R. G. Blackadar and R. R. H. Lemon published maps of the region for another Geological Survey of Canada. Soon thereafter Texas Gulf Sulfur Company (later Texasgulf Inc., now broken up into bits such as Intrepid Potash) evaluated the region and staked 15 claims. Extensive drilling and exploration over the next decade led to the procurement of heavy equipment in 1970 and bulk metallurgical testing. Mineral Resources International of Calgary, Alberta traded the rights to a sulfur deposit in Mexico for a long term option on the Strathcona Sound property, which eventually translated into 54% ownership of Nanisivik Mines Limited. Strathcona Mineral Services Limited was hired to run the mine as an independent manager and successfully initiated production.

Operation
The mine opened in 1976 and yielded primarily zinc, however silver and lead were collected as by-products. Annual production totalled 125,000 tons of ore, which was sold to European smelters via Belgium.

Conwest Exploration Company Ltd. eventually acquired the mine.

Mine closure 

Since the closure of the mine in 2002, reclamation has been ongoing and the town is abandoned. Residents of Arctic Bay had hoped that the Government of Nunavut would be able to find a new use for the former town site, potentially a trades training centre. They had also hoped to be able to move some of the buildings and equipment to their community.
Due to heavy lead-zinc contamination, this was not possible and the homes have been demolished.
Local telephone service was discontinued on February 19, 2007, on approval from CRTC.

As of the 2006 census the population was 0, a drop from the 2001 census with a population of 77.

Conversion to naval station 

On August 8, 2007, CBC News reported that Canadian Forces documents showed plans to convert the site into a naval station. The plan, which would turn the former mine's existing port into a deepwater facility, would cost $60 million and it was expected that Prime Minister Stephen Harper would make an announcement during his stop in Resolute.

On August 10, 2007, Harper announced construction of a new docking and refuelling facility in Nanisivik for the Canadian Forces, in an effort to maintain a Canadian presence in Arctic waters during the navigable season (June–October). The choice for Nanisivik as a site was partially based on its location within the eastern entrance to the Northwest Passage, and the existence of a deep-water berthing facility at the site, as well as a "jet-capable" airstrip nearby.

Detailed planning for the project began in August 2007, with environmental studies and assessments being carried out in the summer of 2008. Construction at the site was originally expected to begin in the summer of 2010, with early operating capability available in 2012. The facility was planned to be fully operational by 2015.

Once completed, the naval station will likely be home to the proposed Arctic Off-Shore Patrol Ships under the Harper government plan.
These ships will have ice-breaking capability and help the current government's goal to enforce Canada's sovereignty over the region. These ships will likely allow the Victoria-class submarines to travel in the Arctic regions.

The facility was to have an initial operational capability in 2012, and be fully complete in 2015 but is behind schedule. Development is being delayed because environmental cleanup has been delayed as much as possible by Breakwater Resources Ltd., owned by Nyrstar N.V.

In 2011 and 2012, the government started backing down on the Nanisivik conversion plans, explaining that construction in the far north is too expensive. The station will be primarily used for refuelling Arctic patrol and other government vessels, and construction was expected to begin in 2013, with the station operational by 2016. After repeated delays, construction on the site finally commenced in 2015. The station had been expected to be operational in summer 2019. However, in July 2020 it was confirmed that the station would not now be fully operational until 2022.

Geography

Climate 
Nanisivik has a tundra climate (ET) with long, cold winters and very short, chilly summers that are rarely mild. Early winter tends to be snowiest period of the year, with around 40% of all yearly snowfall falling during this short period.

References

External links 
Government will continue seeking positive legacy from Nanisivik mine closure, minister says. Government of Nunavut. October 1, 2002. Last accessed September 12, 2006.
Welcome to the Arctic Bay & Nanisivik, Nunavut Photo Album!. Photographs by Vincent K. Chan. Last accessed September 12, 2006.
 

Baffin Island
Company towns in Canada
Mining communities in Nunavut
Ports and harbours of Nunavut
Ghost towns in Nunavut
Former populated places in the Qikiqtaaluk Region
Road-inaccessible communities of Nunavut